The Sa'ar 2 class ("Shalechet") is a class of missile boats built in Cherbourg, France at the Constructions Mécaniques de Normandie shipyard based on Israeli Navy modification of the German Navy's . Three of the ships class were converted from s in 1974.

Design and development 
The Israeli naval command had reached the conclusion by the early 1960s that their old Second World War-era destroyers, frigates and corvettes were obsolete and new ships and vessels were needed. Yitzhak Shoshan, later to command the destroyer INS Eilat at the time of her sinking, surveyed the available torpedo boat designs and recommended the German Jaguar class. The Israeli Navy asked Lürssen, the shipyard which built the Jaguar class, to modify the wooden design by switching to steel construction, adding  to the length, and revising the internal compartmentalization.  Due to Arab League pressure on the German government, this plan was not continued and a new builder was sought. The Israeli Navy discovered that the Cherbourg-based Constructions Mécaniques de Normandie shipyard owned by Félix Amiot had experience building patrol boats in cooperation with Lürssen and would build the boats, based upon the German designs and plans. The engines were imported from Germany. The project received the codename "Falling Leaves".

An initial group of six boats was ordered in 1965, with an armament of Bofors 40 mm guns and torpedo tubes and provision for fitting sonar. This group was designated the Sa'ar 1 class. When refitted with Gabriel anti-ship missiles, they became the Sa'ar 2 class. A second group of six boats, the Sa'ar 3 class, was ordered in 1968, with an OTO Melara 76 mm gun instead of the Bofors guns of the Sa'ar 1 class and with anti-submarine provisions omitted.

Description 
The boats were long, slender vessels. Displacement is  standard and  full load.

The vessels in the class come in two versions of armament. One version is equipped with five to eight Gabriel II surface-to-surface missiles (SSM), one Bofors L/70 40 mm gun, two  caliber M1919A4 Browning machine guns and four 7.62 mm FN MAG 58 general-purpose machine guns.

The other version is equipped with four RGM-84 Harpoon SSMs and two Gabriel II SSMs.

Boats in the class

See also 
List of ships of the Israeli Navy

References

Citations

Sources
 
 
 
 
 

Missile boat classes
Missile boats of the Israeli Navy
Museum ships in Israel